Monopis fenestratella is a moth belonging to the family Tineidae. The species was first described by Carl von Heyden in 1863.

It is native to Europe.

References

Tineinae
Moths described in 1863
Taxa named by Carl von Heyden